Paul Barnaby "PB" Scott (born November 22, 1975) is a prominent Caribbean businessman, investor, and philanthropist. He currently serves as Chairman, and CEO, and is the principal shareholder of the Musson Group of Companies, a diversified Group with controlling stakes in public and private companies operating in more than 30 countries throughout the Caribbean, Central American region, and the Pacific.

Career 
Scott joined the Musson Group of Companies in 1994, and progressed to the role of CEO in 2004, succeeding Desmond Blades. He was later named Chairman of the board in 2009. Scott is credited with leading Musson's expansion from wholesale food distribution and manufacturing business in Jamaica into a geographically diversified business with interests in IT (Productive Business Solutions), Food and pharmaceutical distribution (Seprod, T. Geddes Grant Distributors), and Insurance (General Accident Insurance), among others. 

As Chairman, Scott is responsible for the strategic direction, performance, and overall operations of the Musson Group and all of its subsidiaries and affiliates. These include Seprod, Productive Business Solutions (PBS), General Accident, and T. Geddes Grant Distributors. 

Scott also serves as Chairman of Eppley;  the leading alternative investment company in the Caribbean focused on credit, mezzanine, real estate, and infrastructure. Eppley Caribbean Property Fund is the largest listed real estate mutual fund in the Caribbean, and is listed on the Barbados, Trinidad & Tobago, and Jamaican stock exchanges.

Public Service 
Scott has served as part of several boards, organizations, and commissions in Jamaica. He is the current Chairman of the Development Bank of Jamaica (DBJ) and the Treasurer of the American International School of Kingston (AISK). He is currently a founding director and deputy chairman of the Caribbean Private Sector Organisation (CPSO). 

He is also a past president of the Private Sector Organisation of Jamaica (PSOJ) and a former Honorary Consul General for the Republic of Guatemala in Jamaica. In 2017 PB Scott was awarded the Jamaican national honor of the Order of Distinction (Commander Rank) for his contribution to business development in Jamaica and the Caribbean.

References 

Living people
1975 births
People from Hexham
Jamaican chief executives
English expatriates in Jamaica